Jessica Galli (born December 1, 1983) is a female wheelchair racing athlete. Raised in Hillsborough Township, New Jersey, Galli has participated in the 2000, 2004, and 2008 Paralympic Games. At the 2000 Sydney Paralympic Games she won the silver medal in the 800 meter T53 female wheelchair race.  Galli set a world record holder in the T53 400 m race with a time of 55.82 at the 2007 European Wheelchair Championships on June 7 in Pratteln, Switzerland.

In January 2008, she was named the United States Olympic Committee's 2007 Paralympian of the Year. That summer, Galli was nominated for an ESPY Award for Best Female Athlete With A Disability.  At the 2008 Summer Paralympics in September, she won five medals: 1 gold, 3 silver, and 1 bronze.

Galli is a paraplegic as a result of a September 1991 car accident when she was 7 years old.  She became involved in Paralympic Sports by joining the Children's Lightning Wheels PSC at the recommendation of a recreational therapist at Children's Specialized Hospital, where she underwent rehabilitation.

References

External links 

Jessica Galli on US Paralympics 

1983 births
Living people
People with paraplegia
American female wheelchair racers
Illinois Fighting Illini Paralympic athletes
Sportspeople from Hillsborough Township, New Jersey
Paralympic track and field athletes of the United States
Athletes (track and field) at the 2000 Summer Paralympics
Athletes (track and field) at the 2004 Summer Paralympics
Athletes (track and field) at the 2008 Summer Paralympics
Paralympic gold medalists for the United States
Paralympic silver medalists for the United States
Paralympic bronze medalists for the United States
World record holders in Paralympic athletics
Paralympic wheelchair racers
Medalists at the 2008 Summer Paralympics
Medalists at the 2012 Summer Paralympics
Athletes (track and field) at the 2012 Summer Paralympics
Medalists at the 2000 Summer Paralympics
Paralympic medalists in athletics (track and field)
21st-century American women